Nikolai Nikolayevich Korotkov (1893–1954) was an association football player.

International career
Korotkov played his only game for Russia on 5 July 1914 in a friendly against Sweden.

External links
  Profile

1893 births
1954 deaths
Russian footballers
Russia international footballers
Association football defenders